Tell al-'Ubaid is a low, relatively small tell (settlement mound) west of nearby Ur in southern Iraq's Dhi Qar Governorate. The majority of the remains are from the Chalcolithic Ubaid period, for which Tell al-'Ubaid is the type site, with an Early Dynastic temple and cemetery at the highest point. It was a cult center for the goddess Ninhursag.

History of archaeological research
The site was first worked by Henry Hall of the British Museum in 1919. He found a Early Dynastic III stone statue of Kurlil. Later, C. L. Woolley excavated there in 1923 and 1924, followed by Seton Lloyd and Pinhas Delougaz in 1937, the latter working for the Oriental Institute of the University of Chicago.

Tell al-'Ubaid and its environment
The excavated Early Dynastic temple (A-Ane-pada, the temple of Ninḫursaĝ) is located on the northern edge of the site. The tample was also worked on in the Ur III period.
A cemetery was also found with 96 graves, mostly from the Early Dynastic Period.

Occupation history
The lower level of the site featured large amounts of Ubaid pottery and associated kilns. Evidence for Ubaid period pottery manufacture has also been observed on the surface of the site. The size of the surface scatter indicates that pottery production was a specialized craft, and this confirms finds from other Ubaid sites like Eridu. The site also yielded a cemetery and some finds from the Jemdet Nasr period. The temple of Ninhursag at the summit was on a cleared oval similar to that at Khafajah. The wall surrounding the temple was built by Shulgi of the Ur III Empire.

Gallery

See also

Cities of the Ancient Near East
Copper Bull
Tell al-'Ubaid Copper Lintel

References

External links
Conservation Treatment of a 3rd Millennium BCE Mosaic Column from Al ‘Ubaid
Report on excavations at Tell al'Ubaid

Archaeological sites in Iraq
Former populated places in Iraq
Dhi Qar Governorate
Archaeological type sites
Ubaid period
Tells (archaeology)
7th millennium BC